Pristimantis spinosus is a species of frog in the family Strabomantidae.
It is a small brown-backed frog with postorbital dermal folds, its belly is cream to black, and the posterior surfaces of its thighs and groin are black with white dots.
It is found in Ecuador and possibly Peru.
Its natural habitat is tropical moist montane forests.
It is threatened by habitat loss.

References

spinosus
Endemic fauna of Ecuador
Amphibians of Ecuador
Amphibians of the Andes
Amphibians described in 1979
Taxonomy articles created by Polbot